Manuel Gutiérrez can refer to:

 Manuel Gutiérrez (Mexican footballer), born 1920
 Manuel Gutiérrez (Nicaraguan footballer), born 1987
 Manuel Gutiérrez (swimmer) (born 1964), Panamanian swimmer